ABS-CBN HD was a Philippine pay television channel, working as the high-definition feed of ABS-CBN. It was launched on October 3, 2015 initially on Sky Cable and Destiny Cable and later on iWant, Sky On Demand, and Sky Direct, broadcasting in 1080i at a frame rate of 50 fps (via Sky Direct) or at 60fps.  Until May 5, 2020, all Sky Cable and Sky Direct plans in Metro Manila offer ABS-CBN HD. The network including its HD feed went off-the-air on May 5, 2020 at 7:52pm following TV Patrol. It was replaced by Kapamilya Channel HD on June 13, 2020.

Background

In 2007, ABS-CBN produced the first ever Filipino TV series to be shot in high-definition. This was Rounin, a science fiction, fantasy series created by Erik Matti. This was followed by Budoy in 2011. Prior to this, big-budget series like Esperanza, Mula sa Puso, Pangako Sa 'Yo, and Kay Tagal Kang Hinintay were shot in 16mm film with a 4:3 aspect ratios while low budget series, on the other hand, were shot in smaller formats. The network's last drama series to be produced in 4:3 aspect ratio is Moon of Desire which aired from March 31 to August 15, 2014, while the last program overall to be produced and aired on a said aspect ratio are the ABS-CBN News and Current Affairs programs such as Umagang Kay Ganda, TV Patrol, and Bandila where they were switched to high definition (1080i, 16:9 HDTV) format on April 2, 2018. Beginning with Sana Bukas pa ang Kahapon on June 16, 2014, all of ABS-CBN's TV series were all produced in high-definition format. Ningning was the first Filipino TV series to be broadcast in HD on October 5, 2015, while Maalaala Mo Kaya was the first mini-series to do so the day before. On the other hand, the first ever locally produced live entertainment program to be broadcast in HD was the musical variety show ASAP on October 4, 2015. The aspect ratio of the network's break bumper was changed from 4:3 to 16:9 on June 13, 2016. Overall, TV broadcast contents on ABS-CBN in 4:3 aspect ratio were originally aired until April 1, 2018. Since April 2, 2018, broadcast contents on ABS-CBN are now all in 16:9 aspect ratio thus the network phased out the production of contents in 4:3 ratio on the said date.

On April 19, 2009, Sony announced the acquisition of ABS-CBN of 24 units of its Sony high-definition professional video cameras through a press release published on Sony's official website. On July 11, 2009, ABS-CBN launched a high definition feed of Balls in SkyCable under the name Balls HD, the first local high-definition TV channel in the history of Philippine television. In the same day, Balls HD broadcast the first locally produced coverage of an event in high-definition, the UAAP Season 72 basketball game which was produced by ABS-CBN Sports.  In addition, two of its three news helicopters are capable of transmitting high-definition live feeds from its 5 axis gimbal HD camera mounted on the aircraft.

On April 20, 2010, Ikegami, a Japanese manufacturer of professional and broadcast television equipment announced the acquisition of ABS-CBN of 75 units of Ikegami high-definition professional video cameras for electronic news gathering.

On October 3, 2015, ABS-CBN launched a high-definition feed in SkyCable and Destiny Cable under the name ABS-CBN HD. This marked the Philippines' first commercial television network to be launched in high-definition. The said channel would broadcast selected shows of ABS-CBN in true high-definition picture while the remaining shows would be broadcast in upscaled standard definition picture with pillarbox to preserve its original 4:3 aspect ratio.

On May 5, 2020, ABS-CBN HD was dissolved at 7:52pm after ABS-CBN was forced to go off-air due to cease and desist order from the National Telecommunications Commission after its broadcast franchise expired the previous day. It was replaced with Kapamilya Channel HD on June 13, 2020.

References 

ABS-CBN
Assets owned by ABS-CBN Corporation
High-definition television
Television channels and stations established in 2015
Television channels and stations disestablished in 2020
2015 establishments in the Philippines
2020 disestablishments in the Philippines
ABS-CBN Corporation channels
Filipino-language television stations
Defunct television stations in the Philippines